George William Weidler (January 11, 1926, Los Angeles, California – December 27, 1989, Los Angeles) was an American saxophonist and songwriter. He was the second husband of singer-actress Doris Day (married 1946–1949) and older brother of former child actress Virginia Weidler.

Career
As sideman, Weidler recorded with Freddie Slack, Les Brown, Charlie Barnet, Ike Carpenter, The Delta Rhythm Boys, Stan Kenton, and the Metronome All-Stars. He is credited as having performed on over 57 jazz recordings between 1943 and 1948.

While with Charlie Barnet, his two brothers, Warner (born Werther; 1922–2010) and Walter (born Wolfgang; 1923–2002), both saxophonists, were with the band. From the early 1940s, the three also performed as the Weidler Brothers Orchestra until 1952, when they signed with Capitol Records as "The Wilder Brothers." Around 1950, the Weidler Brothers switched from jazz to pop.

Selected discography
 The Weidler Brothers, Capitol Records 78–108 
 Side A: "The Jolka Polka"
 Side B: "The Schnitzelbank Polka"

With Stan Kenton
Stan Kenton's Milestones (Capitol, 1943-47 [1950])
Stan Kenton Classics (Capitol, 1944-47 [1952])
Encores (Capitol, 1947)
A Presentation of Progressive Jazz (Capitol, 1947)
The Kenton Era (Capitol, 1940–54, [1955])

Family

George William Weidler was one of six children born to the architect Alfred Weidler (1886–1966) and opera singer Margarete Therese Louisa (née Radon). The first four siblings (Waldtraud, Verena, Werther, and Wolfgang) were born in Germany. The eldest sibling, Waldtraud (later known as Sylvia) and the youngest sibling, Virginia, were both child film actresses. And one of his three brothers, Warner (born Werner Alfred Weidler), was a composer.

Marriages

 Weidler married Doris Day in 1946, becoming her second of four husbands; the marriage ended in divorce in 1949.
 Weidler then married Donna Mae Boniface in Clark County, Washington, on November 16, 1950; the marriage ended in either annulment or divorce in Los Angeles in July 1951.
 Weidler then married singer and actress Maureen Arthur (born 1934) on December 5, 1957 in Las Vegas; the marriage ended in divorce in 1970.
 Weidler then married Barbara C. Heussenstam (born 1923) on June 21, 1971, in Los Angeles; they remained married until his death in 1989 at age 63.

References

1926 births
1989 deaths
American jazz saxophonists
American male saxophonists
Swing saxophonists
Musicians from Los Angeles
American people of German descent
20th-century American saxophonists
Songwriters from California
20th-century American composers
Jazz musicians from California
20th-century American male musicians
American male jazz musicians
American male songwriters